Simão Mate Junior (born 23 June 1988) is a Mozambican football player who plays as a defensive midfielder.

He is also a member of the Mozambique national football team, for which he has made 30 appearances since 2007.
He represented the nation at the 2010 Africa Cup of Nations.

Career
Simão Mate started his career at Mozambican club Clube Ferroviário de Maputo in 2005. He was brought to Greece in August 2007 by José Peseiro, who was then the head coach of Panathinaikos, in order to be tested and after a three-week trial, he signed a four-year deal with the Greek club.

Since then he has managed to surprise his coach and the team's fans with his solidness, strength and tenacity. Despite his young age, he has made some first-team appearances and has become a precious solution for his coach Henk ten Cate. Although he was signed in order to play as a defender, circumstances and teammates' injuries made the team's coach to use Simão as a defensive midfielder, actually the player is established at fans' minds as a midfielder rather than a defender.

Simão has been particularly impressive in the minds of many Panathinaikos supporters which came as a surprise, given his relative anonymity and small transfer cost. His debut season was a great success; Simão made 27 first-team appearances. In his second season, he scored a superb volley in Panathinaikos' UEFA Champions League 3rd Round Qualifying match, away to Sparta Prague. He continued to impress domestically and in the Champions League proper, notably marking Diego and nullifying his attacks in Panathinaikos' 3–0 victory against Werder Bremen.

Simão was also included in Tuttosport's list of the top-rated 40 young footballers in the world, becoming the first player of Mozambique to achieve this accolade. On 20 February 2009, Simão signed a new contract with Panathinaikos which included a higher release clause.
Simão also is among the Top-10 Rising Stars for the UEFA Champions League Competition for the season 2008–2009. On 18 February he scored his first goal which came in an away match against Crete-based Ergotelis for the 2011–2012 season.

On 14 June 2012, 16 days before his contract ran out, Simao was released from the club.

On 19 June 2012, Simão signed a contract with Chinese Super League side Shandong Luneng Taishan, rejoining former Panathinaikos manager Henk ten Cate. He made his Super League debut 4 days later, in a 3–1 home victory against Shanghai Shenxin, ending Shandong's 7-league-match winless run. His position in the club became unstable after ten Cate was sacked in September 2012. Radomir Antić, new manager of the club preferred Roda Antar more in the defensive midfielder position. Simão was released by Shandong in early 2013.

Simão made a free move to La Liga club Levante UD in March 2013. On 20 April, Simão made his debut against FC Barcelona and put in an assured display alongside Pape Diop in the centre of midfield.

On 29 December 2018, Simão signed a contract with Vegalta Sendai.

Club statistics

Honours
Panathinaikos
Super League Greece: 2009–10
Greek Football Cup: 2009–10
Vegalta Sendai
J.League Monthly MVP: 2019(June)

References

External links

 
 

 Mate Junior Simão at Panathinaikos FC

1988 births
Living people
Sportspeople from Maputo
Association football midfielders
Mozambican footballers
Mozambique international footballers
Clube Ferroviário de Maputo footballers
Panathinaikos F.C. players
Shandong Taishan F.C. players
Levante UD footballers
Al Ahli SC (Doha) players
Vegalta Sendai players
Super League Greece players
Chinese Super League players
La Liga players
J1 League players
Qatar Stars League players
2010 Africa Cup of Nations players
Mozambican expatriate footballers
Expatriate footballers in Greece
Expatriate footballers in China
Expatriate footballers in Spain
Expatriate footballers in Qatar
Mozambican expatriate sportspeople in Greece
Mozambican expatriate sportspeople in China
Mozambican expatriate sportspeople in Spain
Mozambican expatriate sportspeople in Qatar